The 2020 Booker Prize for Fiction was announced on 19 November 2020. The Booker longlist of 13 books was announced on 27 July, and was narrowed down to a shortlist of six on 15 September. The Prize was awarded to Douglas Stuart for his debut novel, Shuggie Bain, receiving £50,000. Stuart is the second Scottish author to win the Booker Prize, after it was awarded to James Kelman for How Late It Was, How Late in 1994. The ceremony was hosted by John Wilson at the Roundhouse in Central London, and broadcast by the BBC. As a result of the COVID-19 pandemic, the shortlisted authors and guest speakers appeared virtually from their respective homes.

Judging panel
Margaret Busby
Lee Child
Lemn Sissay
Sameer Rahim
Emily Wilson

Nominees

Shortlist

Longlist

See also
List of winners and shortlisted authors of the Booker Prize for Fiction
The official home of the 2020 Booker Prize.

References

Man Booker
Booker Prizes by year
2020 awards in the United Kingdom